{{Infobox school
 | name                    = Escambia Academy
 | logo                    = 
 | motto                   = We are building champions both on and off the field
 | streetaddress           = 268 Cowpen Creek Road
 | city                    = Atmore, Alabama
 | zipcode                 = 36502
 | country                 = United States
 | coordinates             = 
 | coordinates_footnotes   = 
 | pushpin_map             = Alabama
 | type                    = Private School K4-12
 | established             = 
 | us_nces_school_id       = 00001015
 | ceeb                    = 010586
 | principal               = Susan Kirk<ref>

Escambia Academy is a private school in unincorporated Escambia, United States, with an Atmore post office address. It enrolls 215 students in grades KG–12. It was founded in 1970 as a segregation academy.

Description
Escambia Academy is a member of the Alabama Independent School Association (AISA). Escambia Academy is fully accredited by AdvancED.

Escambia uses a school gun raffle as a fund raising tool.

Athletics 
Escambia Academy's varsity teams compete athletically in the Alabama Independent School Association, an organization that was founded to support segregation academies.

AISA Championships
Basketball- 2004 (AISA-AA), 1986 (AISA-A) Boys
Basketball- 2005 (AISA-AA), 2004 (AISA-AA), 2002 (AISA-A), 2000 (AISA-A) Girls 
Football- 2014 AISA Championship (AISA-AAA) 
Football- 2017 AISA Championship (AISA-AA) 
Track and Field- 2010 AISA Championship Boys (AISA-AA)  
Track and Field- 2010 AISA Championship Girls (AISA-AA)  
Track and Field- 2012 AISA Championship Boys (AISA-AA) 
Track and Field- 2012 AISA Championship Girls Tie with Sparta Academy (AISA-AA) 
Track and Field- 2015 AISA Championship (AISA-AAA) 
Track and Field- 2016 AISA Championship (AISA-AA) 
Track and Field- 2017 AISA Championship (AISA-AA) 
Track and Field- 2018 AISA Championship (AISA-AA) 
Track and Filed- 2019 AISA Championship (AISA-AA) 
Track and Field- 2021 AISA Championship Varsity Boys (AISA-AA) 
Powerlifting 2013 AISA Championship (AISA-AAA) and overall Championship  
Powerlifting 2017 EA weightlifters break 3 AISA records  
Powerlifting 2019 AISA Championship (AISA-AA) and overall Championship  
Powerlifting 2020 AISA Championship (AISA-AA) and overall Championship  
Powerlifting 2022 AISA Championship (AISA-AA) and overall Championship

References

External links

1970 establishments in Alabama
Educational institutions established in 1970
Private K-12 schools in Alabama
Schools in Escambia County, Alabama
Segregation academies in Alabama